Châtelard is a commune in the Creuse department in the Nouvelle-Aquitaine region in central France.

Geography

Population

Sights
 The chapel, rebuilt in the twentieth century.
 A menhir, the Pierre du Loup (wolf stone), in the forest.

Personalities

Jean-Francois Jamot (1828–1886) was born here. He became the first bishop of Peterborough, Ontario, Canada.

See also
Communes of the Creuse department

References

Communes of Creuse